The Illawarra-Shoalhaven subtropical rainforest, or Illawarra Subtropical Rainforest (ISR), is a scattered rainforest community in the Illawarra region of New South Wales, Australia. Occurring just south of Sydney, it spans from the Royal National Park (north of Wollongong) to the Milton-Ulladulla district in the south, albeit in scattered fragments.

Geography
A mostly low to moderately tall closed rainforest with a dense mixed tree canopy, it is present on the coastal plain and on foothills beneath the precipitous slopes of the coastal escarpment, on comparatively fertile soils on the slopes and benches of the Illawarra Escarpment and across the Illawarra lowlands on the seaboard, seldom extending onto the upper slopes of the Escarpment. Most of it is present between Gerringong and Stanwell Park, where it spans south to the Shoalhaven River and west into Kangaroo Valley, where other areas of fertile soils are present (e.g. volcanics, coal measures, or colluvial sediments from the escarpment). It is also found in on rocky scree and in deep gully lines. It is found in Local Government Areas (LGAs) of Kiama, Shellharbour, Shoalhaven, Sutherland and Wollongong; and may be present in contiguous LGAs such as Goulburn, Mulwaree and Wingecarribee.

It is found in an area that is warm and humid, with higher rainfall in autumn, lower rainfall in late winter to spring and little possibility of severe frosts. Mean annual rainfall is greater than 1000 mm.

Ecology
There is a scarcity of species from the genera Syncarpia, Acacia, Banksia and Eucalyptus due to the moist, fertile soil. Canopy trees up to 35 m or more in height include Ficus spp., Dendrocnide excelsa, Toona ciliata, Dendrocnide excelsa, Streblus brunonianus and Alphitonia excelsa. 

Other smaller trees and shrubs include Alectryon subcinereus, Alphitonia excelsa, Baloghia inophylla, Brachychiton acerifolius, Citronella moorei, Claoxylon australe, Cryptocarya glaucescens, Cryptocarya microneura, Diospyros australis, Diospyros pentamera, Diploglottis australis, Ehretia acuminata, Elaeodendron australe, Guioa semiglauca, Myrsine variabilis, Pennantia cunninghamii and Planchonella australis, in addition to climbers, forbs and native grasses.

Fauna
In addition to native bats, wallabies and possums, birds include Gerygone mouki, Pachycephala pectoralis, Meliphaga lewinii, Rhipidura albiscapa, Sericornis citreogularis, Acanthiza pusilla, Psophodes olivaceus, Monarcha melanopsis, Zosterops lateralis, Rhipidura rufifrons, Sericornis frontalis, Eopsaltria australis, Macropygia amboinensis and Platycercus elegans. 

Reptiles and amphibians include Intellagama lesueurii, Litoria citropa, Litoria peronii, Litoria phyllochroa, Litoria verreauxii and Eulamprus quoyii.

References

External links
Map of rainforest extent

Endangered ecological communities
Geography of Sydney
Remnant urban bushland
Vegetation of Australia
Ecoregions of New South Wales
Temperate broadleaf and mixed forests
Forests of New South Wales